Amol Rajan (born 4 July 1983) is an Indian-born British journalist and broadcaster who was the BBC's Media Editor from December 2016 to January 2023, and has been a presenter on the Today programme on BBC Radio 4 since 2021.

Rajan was editor of The Independent newspaper from June 2013. When The Independent announced it was dropping the print edition in February 2016, and continuing as only an online operation, Rajan was retained for a period as "editor-at-large".

In August 2022, it was announced that Rajan would take over from Jeremy Paxman as the host of University Challenge from autumn 2023 onwards.

Early life and education
Rajan was born in Calcutta, India, to a mother from Poona and a Tamil father from Combaconum. Due to Tamil naming customs, Rajan was born V. Amol, with the V. for his father's given name of Varadarajan. This name was modified to Amol Varadarajan when he came to England, and the family later changed their surname to Rajan. 

Rajan was three when his family moved to England, and was raised in Tooting, South West London. The son of Hindu parents, he has said that he has been a "non-believer" in religion since the age of 15 and that he does not believe in God. He was state school educated at Graveney School and read English at Downing College, Cambridge, where he contributed to Varsity. He was editor of the student newspaper for a term in 2005. At the age of 18, Rajan worked in the Foreign and Commonwealth Office (FCO) for one year during his gap year.

Career
Rajan was the secondary presenter on The Wright Stuff, the daytime talk show on the Five network, during its 2006–2007 series. He was also a researcher on the programme.

He joined The Independent newspaper in August 2007, where he was over the next few years a news reporter, sports correspondent, columnist, comment editor, and editor of Independent Voices. He has also written a Monday column for the London Evening Standard and restaurant criticism for The Independent on Sunday, and has contributed to The Salisbury Review. The latter publication, according to Rajan, "still publishes writing on politics, history and culture that is among the finest produced in English today. It is frequently offensive, and I cannot say I often agree with its editorial position, but that is all the more reason to read it."

In 2013, aged 29, Rajan became the first non-white editor of a national newspaper in over a century when his Independent appointment was announced, (Rachel Beer was the first, as editor of The Sunday Times and The Observer.) His predecessor as editor of The Independent, Chris Blackhurst, became Group Content Director. When The Independent proprietor Evgeny Lebedev announced a move to digital-only in February 2016, with the imminent closure of the print edition, it emerged that Rajan would remain with the company to help facilitate the change in direction. For about eighteen months before becoming editor of The Independent, Rajan was the media advisor to Evgeny Lebedev, the son of Alexander Lebedev, a former KGB economic attaché. During an October 2019 broadcast Rajan presented for BBC Radio 2 in 2019, journalist Peter Oborne accused Rajan of engaging in "client" and "crony" journalism.

Rajan's role as editor-at-large for The Independent website ended after he was appointed the BBC's first Media Editor in November 2016, and he assumed his new post on 12 December. He has also hosted The Big Debate on the BBC Asian Network.

Since 2017, Rajan has provided holiday cover for several presenters on BBC Radio 2, including Simon Mayo, Jeremy Vine and Zoe Ball. Rajan has occasionally presented The One Show. From May 2017 he presented The Media Show on BBC Radio 4 in succession to Steve Hewlett, although he stepped down from that role when he joined the presenting team of the Today programme on BBC Radio 4 in 2021.

In August 2022, it was announced that Rajan will take over from Jeremy Paxman as the host of University Challenge from autumn 2023 onwards.

Opinions on the royal family
The Guardian wrote, "Amol Rajan, (...) is a declared republican who once branded the royal family as 'absurd' and the media as a 'propaganda outlet' for the monarchy." In 2021, he publicly apologised for comments made in a 2012 article he wrote for The Independent, in which he described Prince Philip as a "racist buffoon" and Prince Charles (now Charles III) as "scientifically illiterate", and for an open letter he sent to Prince William and his wife Catherine while the two were expecting their first child, in which he described their public role as a "total fraud", the Queen's Diamond Jubilee as a "celebration of mediocrity", and the royal family as a clan "unusually full of fools".

In November 2021, the BBC broadcast The Princes and the Press, a two-part documentary presented by Rajan that explored the relationship between the royal family and the media. He also narrated the BBC podcast Harry, Meghan and the Media, which was released in January 2022.

Personal life
Rajan is a cricket enthusiast, and plays for the Authors XI. His first book, Twirlymen, the Unlikely History of Cricket's Greatest Spin Bowlers, was published by Random House in 2011. In September 2013, he married the academic Charlotte Faircloth, in Cambridge. They live in London and have three children.

References

External links
The Media Show (BBC Radio 4)

1983 births
Living people
Alumni of Downing College, Cambridge
Indian emigrants to England
English male journalists
English newspaper editors
BBC television presenters
BBC Asian Network presenters
BBC newsreaders and journalists
I (newspaper) journalists
The Independent editors
British newspaper journalists
Journalists from London
People from Tooting
Naturalised citizens of the United Kingdom
Former Hindus
British atheists
English people of Tamil descent
Writers from Kolkata
University Challenge
British republicans